The Hohsandhorn (also known as Punta del Sabbione) is a mountain of the Lepontine Alps on the Swiss-Italian border.

References

External links
 Hohsandhorn on Hikr

Mountains of the Alps
Alpine three-thousanders
Mountains of Piedmont
Mountains of Valais
Italy–Switzerland border
International mountains of Europe
Lepontine Alps
Mountains of Switzerland